The Tamagawa Line may refer to either of the following railway and tramway lines in Tokyo, Japan:
 Tamagawa Line operated by Seibu Railway
 Tamagawa Line (tramway) formerly operated by Tokyu Corporation, a surviving branch of which is the Tōkyū Setagaya Line
 Tōkyū Tamagawa Line operated by Tokyu Corporation